IEEE Microwave Magazine is a professional magazine for the members of IEEE Microwave Theory and Techniques Society that is published monthly with several special conference issues. It is also available to others as a part of the IEEE Xplore. In addition to providing societal communications to the MTT-S membership, it has regular columns giving insight into a range of technical and non-technical interests and the publication of technical feature-length articles that provide overviews and tutorials on the state-of-the-art in a given area. Currently, a typical print run is approximately 15,000 issues.

IEEE Microwave Magazine made its debut as a quarterly publication in 2000, changed to bimonthly in 2006 and changed to monthly in 2019. The current editor is Robert Caverly of Villanova University. The Journal Citation Reports 2018 impact factor was 2.949.

See also
IEEE Transactions on Microwave Theory and Techniques
IEEE Microwave and Wireless Components Letters
IEEE Transactions on Terahertz Science and Technology

External links

References

Bimonthly magazines published in the United States
Monthly magazines published in the United States
Quarterly magazines published in the United States
Engineering magazines
Microwave Magazine
Magazines established in 2000
Science and technology magazines published in the United States